Port Vale Football Club is an English professional football club based in the city of Stoke-on-Trent. It was founded in the late 1870s. When league football began, the first team – then playing under the name Burslem Port Vale – competed in the Midland League before being elected to the newly formed Second Division of the Football League in 1892. However it wasn't until 1896 that it was first recorded that newly appointed club secretary Sam Gleaves would take on what are now seen as managerial responsibilities.

There have been 38 full-time managers: the most recent appointment was that of Darrell Clarke, who was hired as the club's manager in February 2021. Tommy Clare was appointed in 1905 as Port Vale's first manager-secretary, though his role also included secretarial duties. The reported history and responsibilities of the club's management position remained sketchy and vague until Joe Schofield's appointment as secretary in March 1920. He picked the first-team right up until his death on 29 September 1929. His successor, long-time backroom staff member Tom Morgan, was the first appointment to be referred to solely as the club's manager. From then on the club employed a full-time manager, except for the 1935–36 season, when the club attempted to do without one and were relegated as a result. Morgan led the club to their best-ever league finish, fifth in the Second Division in 1930–31. John Rudge has had the longest tenure, of fifteen years and one month (749 matches) from 1983 to 1999. This was Rudge's only role in management and he now serves as club president. He led the club to promotions in 1985–86, 1988–89 and 1993–94, as well as the Football League Trophy title in 1993. Freddie Steele was one of four men to have had two spells as manager, and in his first tenure led the club to the Third Division North title and FA Cup semi-finals in 1953–54.

The following list details the statistical record of the managers and any honours or promotions they achieved. This chronological list comprises all those who have held the position of manager of the first team of Port Vale. Each manager's entry includes his dates of tenure and the club's overall competitive record (in terms of matches won, drawn and lost), honours won and significant achievements while under his care. Caretaker managers are included, where known, as well as those who have been in permanent charge.

History

The first man recorded to hold managerial responsibilities at the club was Sam Gleaves as club secretary in 1896, a position he held for nine years. He was succeeded by Tommy Clare, though it was Sam Bennion at the helm when the club left the Second Division and folded at the end of the 1906–07 season. Port Vale reformed in the obscurity of the North Staffordshire Federation League and it was Harry Myatt who was next recorded as first-team manager in October 1913. He was soon followed by Tom Holford and Jock Cameron. Vale's first major success was with Tom Morgan, who managed the club to the Third Division North title in the 1929–30 season, though he had simply carried on the work of Joe Schofield, who died on 29 September 1929 after over nine years in the post. Morgan was replaced by former manager Tom Holford in June 1932, who led the club to a record high finish of eighth in the Second Division in 1933–34. He was however sacked in September 1935 and not replaced, as the club reverted to selection by committee. Following relegation, the club appointed former England full-back Warney Cresswell as manager-coach in May 1936. He lasted just one season and Tom Morgan was reinstated in December 1937, who tendered his resignation shortly before World War II in April 1939.

Jack Diffin and David Pratt both had brief spells as manager, neither men managing to balance their duties in the Royal Air Force with their club responsibilities. Instead it was Billy Frith who would be the club's first post-war manager, though Gordon Hodgson replaced him in October 1946. He was in charge of the team as the club moved from the Old Recreation Ground to Vale Park but unfortunately became the second talented coach to die in office as Port Vale manager when he succumbed to throat cancer on 14 June 1951. Ivor Powell would prove a less than worthy successor and was sacked in November 1951 after winning just two of his 19 games in charge. Freddie Steele would be the man who unlocked the potential of the young squad at his disposal, leading them to the Third Division North title and the semi-finals of the FA Cup in 1953–54 with an "Iron Curtain" defence. He would though tender his resignation in January 1957 and Norman Low was unable to prevent relegation at the end of the 1956–57 season. Low's attacking style brought the club the Fourth Division title in 1958–59, though he resigned in October 1962 over a transfer policy disagreement with the board of directors. Steele was reappointed but proved unable to replicate his earlier success and left by mutual consent in February 1965. Jackie Mudie failed to prevent relegation at the end of the 1964–65 campaign and later resigned in May 1967, citing personal reasons. Football and Potteries icon, Ballon d'Or winner Stanley Matthews was made Port Vale manager in May 1967. A disastrous 1967–68 season and financial scandal involving players' pay led to his resignation in May 1968 and he vowed to never work in management again.

The appointment of 34-year old Gordon Lee in May 1968 revitalized the club. Lee guided the club to promotion out of the Fourth Division at the end of the 1969–70 season, before he left to manage Blackburn Rovers in January 1974. Club legend and record appearance holder Roy Sproson took charge in January 1974, only to leave in acrimonious circumstances in October 1977. Bobby Smith was appointed as manager the following month and despite overseeing a relegation at the Vale, was hired as Swindon Town's  new boss in May 1978. His assistant, Dennis Butler, stepped up to the head role as the Vale and spent big on transfers with very little success. Butler left by mutual consent in August 1979 and Stoke City legend Alan Bloor took the reins, only to resign four months later after finding that management was not for him. With the club at a low ebb, John McGrath took over and his strict disciplinarian style won the club a promotion in 1982–83. He was unable to build on this success and left in December 1983, with relegation almost guaranteed. John Rudge was promoted from assistant to manager and over the next 15 years would prove himself to be the best manager in the club's history. He led the "Valiants" to promotion in 1985–86 and again in 1988–89 after success in the play-off final. Though relegation came in 1991–92, he rebuilt and led the club to the Football League Trophy in 1993 and promotion back into the second tier at the end of the 1993–94 season.

Rudge was sacked in January 1999 and though club legend Brian Horton kept the club up that season, relegation followed in the year 2000. He led the club to another Football League Trophy title in 2001 and steadied the ship following a period of administration but quit with the Vale in the play-offs of the third tier in February 2004. Another club legend, Martin Foyle, spent the next three years as manager before departing by mutual consent in September 2007. Lee Sinnott came in two months later, the first time in 28 years someone was appointed who had not previously played or coached at the club. Vale were relegated at the end of the 2007–08 season and manager Dean Glover was given the job initially on a caretaker basis in September 2008. Glover fared poorly however and was sacked at the end of the 2008–09 season. Micky Adams took charge in June 2009, the first experienced manager since Horton. He left Vale in the promotion places to manage boyhood club Sheffield United in December 2010, but a disastrous ten week spell under Jim Gannon ended all hopes of promotion, with Gannon overseeing the shortest reign in the club's history. Adams returned for a second spell in May 2011 and despite the club again entering administration he took the team to promotion out of League Two at the end of the 2012–13 season. He resigned in September 2014 and his assistant, Rob Page, then had close to two seasons in charge with moderate success. Club chairman Norman Smurthwaite then opted for a Continental revolution and appointed Portuguese coach Bruno Ribeiro in June 2016, the first manager born outside of Britain to manage the club on a permanent basis. Ribeiro struggled and his assistant Michael Brown took over after six months. Brown failed to keep the club out of the relegation zone by the end of the 2016–17 season and was sacked in September 2017. Smurthwaite turned to club legend Neil Aspin, who narrowly kept the club in the Football League before resigning in January 2019. John Askey, son of yet another club legend Colin Askey, took charge in February 2019. The club's current manager, Darrell Clarke, was appointed in February 2021. Andy Crosby became the "acting manager" after Clarke entered a three month period of bereavement leave in February 2022. Clarke returned to lead Vale to promotion with a 3–0 victory over Mansfield Town in the League Two play-off final three months later.

Key
All first-team matches in national competition are counted, except the abandoned 1939–40 Football League season and matches in wartime leagues and cups.
 Managers with this background denote secretary-managers.
  Managers with this background and symbol in the "Name" column are italicised to denote caretaker appointments or acting managers.
Managers with the  symbol initially were caretaker-managers made into permanent appointments.
P = matches played; W = matches won; D = matches drawn; L = matches lost; Win % = win percentage
Statistics are complete up to and including the match played on 28 May 2022.

Managers

Records

Nationality

Playing records
Twenty-five Port Vale managers played for Port Vale before or whilst managing them.

Manager of the Month awards

Notes and references
Notes

References

Port Vale
 
Managers